Öcher Schängche  is a puppetry theatre in Aachen, North Rhine-Westphalia, Germany. It was founded by Will Hermanns and others in 1921.

References

External links
  

Aachen
Theatres in North Rhine-Westphalia